Dantrai Longjamnong (born October 7, 1990) is a Thai professional footballer who plays as a defender for Thai League 3 club Muangkan United.

References

External links

1990 births
Living people
Dantrai Longjamnong
Association football defenders
Dantrai Longjamnong
Dantrai Longjamnong